The Cabin with Bert Kreischer is a 2020 reality television web series starring Bert Kreischer, where he is sent to the woods to detox but he brings friends.

Cast 
 Bert Kreischer
 LeeAnn Kreischer

Guests 
 Tom Segura
 Joey Diaz
 Nikki Glaser
 Caitlyn Jenner
 Fortune Feimster
 Donnell Rawlings
 Bobby Lee
 Kaley Cuoco
 Ms. Pat
 Joel McHale
 Gabriel Iglesias
 Big Jay Oakerson
 Anthony Anderson
 Deon Cole

Episodes

Release 
The Cabin with Bert Kreischer was released on October 13, 2020, on Netflix.

References

External links
 
 

2020s American reality television series
2020 American television series debuts
English-language Netflix original programming